Thomas Francis Aloysius Earley (February 19, 1917 – April 5, 1988) was a Major League Baseball pitcher. He played six seasons with the Boston Bees / Braves from 1938 to 1942 and 1945.

In between his playing days Earley served in the United States Navy during World War II from 1943 to 1944.

References

External links

Boston Bees players
Boston Braves players
1917 births
1988 deaths
Baseball players from Boston
Major League Baseball pitchers
Portsmouth Pirates players
Scranton Miners players
Hartford Laurels players
Hartford Bees players
St. Paul Saints (AA) players
Indianapolis Indians players
Tulsa Oilers (baseball) players